Triad High School may refer to:

Triad High School (Illinois)
Triad High School (North Lewisburg, Ohio)
Triad School, Klamath Falls, Oregon